The RV Meteor (also Meteor III) is a multidisciplinary research vessel operating mainly in high seas. She is owned by the German state represented by its Federal Ministry of Education and Research and registered in Hamburg.

RV Meteor operates mainly in the areas of the Atlantic, the eastern Pacific, and the western Indian Oceans, as well as the Mediterranean and the Baltic Seas.

Until 2012, Meteor was operated by Bremerhaven based company F. Laeisz GmbH. Since January 2013 the ship has a new operator, Briese Schiffahrt in Leer. It can accommodate up to 30 scientists for work in 20 laboratories on the main deck.

References

External links

Meteor homepage (German)
Briese Schiffahrts (shipping company operating the Meteor)
Research Vessel Meteor (by German Marine Research Consortium)
List of cruise reports (all scientific cruises back to 1986)

Research vessels of Germany
Ships built in Lübeck
1986 ships